{{Infobox saint
|honorific_prefix=Saint
|name=Pedro Calungsod
|image=Pedro Calsungod.jpg
|imagesize=
|caption= Posthumous portrait of Calungsod by Rafael del Casal, 1999
|titles=Lay Catechist and Martyr|birth_date= July 21, 1654
|birth_place= Ginatilan, Cebu, Captaincy General of the Philippines, Spanish Empire
|death_date= 
|death_place= Tumon, Guam, Captaincy General of the Philippines, Spanish Empire
|feast_day=April 2
|beatified_date=March 5, 2000
|beatified_place=St. Peter's Basilica, Vatican City
|beatified_by=Pope John Paul II
|canonized_date=October 21, 2012
|canonized_place=St. Peter's Basilica, Vatican City
|canonized_by=Pope Benedict XVI
|major_shrine= Cebu Archdiocesan Shrine of Saint Pedro Calungsod, Archbishop's Residence Compound, 234 D. Jakosalem St., Cebu City 6000 PH
|attributes=Martyr's palm, Spear, Bolo, Doctrina Christiana book, Rosary, Christogram,
 Crucifix
|patronage= Filipino youth, Catechumens, Altar servers, the Philippines, Overseas Filipino Workers, Guam, Cebuanos, Visayans, Archdiocese of Cebu, Pury, San Antonio, Quezon Province
|issues=
|suppressed_date=
|venerated_in=Catholic Church
|prayer=
}}Pedro Calungsod ( or archaically ; mid-1650s – April 2, 1672), also known as Peter Calungsod and Pedro Calonsor', was a Catholic Filipino-Visayan migrant, sacristan and missionary catechist who, along with the Spanish Jesuit missionary Diego Luis de San Vitores, suffered religious persecution and martyrdom in Guam for their missionary work in 1672.

While in Guam, Calungsod preached Christianity to the Chamorros through catechesis, while baptizing infants, children, and adults at the risk and expense of being persecuted and eventually murdered. Through Calungsod and San Vitores's missionary efforts, many native Chamorros converted to Catholicism.

Calungsod was beatified on March 5, 2000, by Pope John Paul II, and canonized by Pope Benedict XVI at Saint Peter's Basilica in Vatican City on October 21, 2012.

 Early years and missionary work

Birthplace dispute
Few details of the early life of Calungsod (spelled Calonsor in Spanish records) are known. Historical records do not mention his exact birthplace or birth date and merely identified him as "Pedro Calonsor, el Visayo." Historical research identifies Ginatilan in Cebu, Hinunangan and Hinundayan in Southern Leyte, and the Molo district of Iloilo City as possible places of origin; Loboc, Bohol also makes a claim. Of these claims, the one from Ginatilan, Cebu, is considered the strongest. Nonetheless, all four locations were within the Diocese of Cebu at the time of Calungsod's martyrdom.

Proponents of an Ilonggo origin argue that in the early Spanish period, the term "Visayan" exclusively referred to people from the island of Panay and the nearby islands of Negros and Romblon. In contrast, people from Cebu, Bohol, and Leyte were called "Pintados." Thus, had he been born in Cebu, he would have been referred to as "Calonsor El Pintado" instead of "Calonsor El Visayo"; the term "Visayan" receiving its present scope (i.e., including inhabitants of Cebu, Bohol, and Leyte) sometime the 1700s. However, American historian and scholar John N. Schumacher disputes the Bisaya/Pintados dichotomy claim as at that time the Pintados were also referred to as Visayans regardless of location and said Calungsod "was a Visayan" and may have been but doubtfully "from the island of Cebu" or "could have come any other Visayas islands."

The Cebu camp reasoned that Ginatilan contains a high density of people surnamed Calungsod and that during the beatification process, they were the initial claimants to having been Calungsod's birthplace. The Calungsods of Iloilo also claim to be the oldest branch, based on baptismal records containing the surname "Calungsod" dating to circa 1748, compared to branches in Cebu and Leyte, which possess baptismal records dating only to 1828 and 1903, respectively.

Training and arrival in Guam
In Cebu, Calungsod received primary education at a Jesuit boarding school, mastering the Catechism and learning to communicate in Spanish. He also likely honed his drawing, painting, singing, acting, and carpentry skills, as these were necessary for missionary work.

In 1668, Calungsod, then around 14, was amongst the young catechists chosen to accompany Spanish Jesuit missionaries to the Islas de Los Ladrones ("Isles of Thieves"), which had been renamed the Mariana Islands the year before to honor both the Virgin Mary and the mission's benefactress, María Ana of Austria, Queen Regent of Spain. Calungsod accompanied the priest Diego San Vitores to Guam to catechize the native Chamorros. Missionary life on the island was difficult as provisions did not arrive regularly, the jungles and terrain were difficult to traverse, and the Marianas were frequently devastated by typhoons. The mission nevertheless persevered, and a significant number of locals were baptized.

 Martyrdom 
A Chinese man named Choco, a criminal from Manila who was exiled in Guam, began spreading rumors that missionaries' baptismal water was poisonous. As some sickly Chamorro infants who were baptized eventually died, many believed the story and held the missionaries responsible. Choco was readily supported by the macanjas (medicine men) and the urritaos (young males) who despised the missionaries.

In their search for a runaway companion named Esteban, Calungsod and San Vitores came to the village of Tumon, Guam, on April 2, 1672. They learned that the wife of the village's chief Matå'pang had given birth to a daughter, and they immediately went to baptize the child. Influenced by the slanders of Choco, Chief Matå'pang strongly opposed; to give him some time to calm down, the missionaries gathered the children and some adults of the village at the nearby shore and started chanting with them the tenets of the Catholic faith. They invited Matå'pang to join them, but he shouted back that he was angry with God and was fed up with Christian teachings.

Determined to kill the missionaries, Matå'pang went away and tried to enlist another villager, a pagan named Hirao. The latter initially refused, mindful of the missionaries' kindness towards the natives, but became piqued and eventually capitulated when Matå'pang branded him a coward. While Matå'pang was away from his house, San Vitores and Calungsod baptized the baby girl with her Christian mother's consent.

When Matå'pang learned of his daughter's baptism, he became even more furious. He violently hurled spears first at Calungsod, who was able to dodge them. Witnesses claim that Calungsod could have escaped the attack but did not desert San Vitores. Those who knew Calungsod personally considered his martial abilities and that he could have defeated the aggressors with weapons; San Vitores had, however, banned his companions from bearing arms. Calungsod was struck with a spear in the chest and fell to the ground; Hirao immediately charged him and finished him off with a machete blow to the head. San Vitores quickly absolved Calungsod before he too was killed.

Matå'pang took San Vitores's crucifix and pounded it with a stone. The assassins then undressed the corpses of both Calungsod and San Vitores, tied large rocks to the feet, and after loading these on their proas, dumped the bodies out in Tumon Bay.

The Catholic Church considers Calungsod's martyrdom to have been committed In Odium Fidei ('In Hatred of the Faith').

Beatification
A month after the martyrdom of San Vitores and Calungsod, a process for beatification was initiated but only for San Vitores. Political and religious turmoil, however, delayed and halted the process for centuries. In 1981, as Hagåtña was preparing for its 20th anniversary as a diocese, the 1673 beatification cause of San Vitores was rediscovered in old manuscripts and revived until he was finally beatified on October 6, 1985. This also gave recognition to Calungsod, paving the way for his beatification.

In 1980, then-Archbishop of Cebu Ricardo Cardinal Vidal asked permission from the Vatican to initiate Calungsod's beatification and canonization cause. In March 1997, the Sacred Congregation for the Causes of Saints approved the acta of the diocesan beatification process. That same year, Cardinal Vidal appointed Fr Ildebrando Leyson as vice-postulator for the cause, tasked with compiling a Positio Super Martyrio ("position regarding the martyrdom") to be scrutinized by the Congregation. The positio, which relied heavily on San Vitores's beatification documentation, was completed in 1999.

Wanting to include young Asian laypersons in his first beatification for the Great Jubilee in 2000, Pope John Paul II paid particular attention to the cause of Calungsod. In January 2000, he approved the decree super martyrio ("concerning the martyrdom") of Calungsod, scheduling his beatification for March 5 of that year at Saint Peter's Square in Rome.

Regarding Calungsod's charitable works and virtuous deeds, John Paul II declared:

 Sainthood 

On December 19, 2011, the Holy See officially approved the miracle qualifying Calungsod for sainthood by the Roman Catholic Church. The recognized miracle dates from March 26, 2003, when a woman from Leyte, pronounced clinically dead two hours after a heart attack, was revived when an attending physician invoked Calungsod's intercession.

Cardinal Angelo Amato presided over the declaration ceremony on behalf of the Congregation for the Causes of Saints. He later revealed that Pope Benedict XVI had approved and signed the official promulgation decrees recognizing the miracles as authentic and worthy of belief. The College of Cardinals was then sent a dossier on the new saints, and they were asked to indicate their approval. On February 18, 2012, after the Consistory for the Creation of Cardinals, Cardinal Amato formally petitioned the pope to announce the new saints' canonization. On October 21, 2012, Pope Benedict XVI canonized Calungsod in Saint Peter's Square. The pope wore papal vestments used only on special occasions. Cardinal Ricardo Jamin Vidal, the Archbishop Emeritus of Cebu, concelebrated at the canonization Mass.

Relics 
At his canonization Mass, Calungsod was the only saint without a first class relic exposed for veneration, as his body had been thrown into the sea and lost. The cutlass used to hack Calungsod's head and neck was retrieved from Guam by Cardinal Vidal and is now venerated as a second-class relic. During the homily, Benedict XVI said that Calungsod received the Sacrament of Absolution from San Vitores before his death.

Feast day
After Saint Lorenzo Ruíz of Manila, Calungsod is the second Filipino to be declared a saint by the Roman Catholic Church. The Roman Martyrology celebrates Calungsod's feast along with Blessed Diego Luis de San Vitores every April 2, their dies natalis (heavenly birthdate); when April 2 falls within Holy Week or the Octave of Easter, his feast is transferred to the Saturday of the Fifth Week of Lent, the day after the Friday of Sorrows and before Palm Sunday.

Saturday has been designated as the weekly day for devotions and novenas in his honor, as he was killed on a first Saturday.

Birthplace issue
Various areas in the Visayan islands claim that Pedro Calungsod was born and raised there. Extensive research provided by the census research of Ginatilan, Cebu provided a longstanding record of Calonsor and Calungsod natives from their area, from which a strong claim had the most Calungsod natives originating since Filipino-Spanish era since the late 1700s.  According to the Parish Pastoral Council William Pancho of Ginatilan, Cebu, there is a strong claim that in the mid-1600s, there were three Calungsod brothers:

 Valerio Calungsod, who migrated to Iloilo
 Casimiro Calungsod, who emigrated to Bohol
 Pablo Calungsod, who remained in Ginatilan, Cebu, and was the father of Pedro Calungsod.

In a public televised interview with ABS-CBN chief correspondent and newscaster Korina Sanchez, Cardinal Ricardo Jamin Vidal expressed his dismay that when the original beatification process of Pedro Calungsod began in the 1980s, no city except for Ginatilan, Cebu, was willing to come forward and claim credit for being Pedro's birthplace. Not surprisingly, however, when Pedro's canonization became official, Catholic bishops from the nearby provinces of Cebu, Bohol, Leyte, Samar, Iloilo and various Mindanao provinces suddenly came out of the woodwork, all laying claim to be the "official birthplace" of the newly minted saint.

As a result, Cardinal Vidal ruled that he will not establish a definitive judgment on his birthplace since Spanish records only indicate the words "Pedro Calonsor, El Visayo" as his native description. Furthermore, he stated that all Visayan provinces were under the ecclesiastical jurisdiction of the Archdiocese of Cebu during the Filipino-Spanish era.

 Iconography 

It is not known what Calungsod looked like, as no contemporary depictions survive. The writer Alcina, who was a contemporary of Pedro Calungsod, described the male Visayan indios of his time as usually more corpulent, better built, and somewhat taller than the Tagalogs in Luzon; that their skin was light brown; that their faces were usually round and of fine proportions; that their noses were flat; that their eyes and hair were black; that they – especially the youth – wore their hair a little bit longer; and that they already started to wear camisas (shirts) and calzones (knee-breeches). Pedro Chirino, S.J., who also worked in the Visayas in the 1590s, similarly described the Visayans as well-built, of pleasing countenance and light-skinned.

Calungsod is often depicted as a teenaged young man wearing a camisa de chino that is sometimes bloodied and usually dark, loose trousers. His most famous attributes are the martyr's palm pressed to his chest and the Doctrina Christiana. He is depicted in mid-stride, occasionally also bearing a rosary or crucifix to indicate his missionary status. In some early statues, Calungsod is shown with a spear and catana (cutlass), the instruments of his death.

 In art 
The first portrayals stated to be of Pedro Calungsod were drawings made by Eduardo Castrillo in 1994 for the Heritage of Cebu Monument in Parian. A bronze statue representing Calungsod was made and forms part of the monument. Sculptors Francisco dela Victoria and Vicente Gulane of Cebu and Justino Cagayat, Jr., of Paete, Laguna, created statues representing Calungsod in 1997 and 1999, respectively.
   
When the Archdiocese of Manila in 1998 published the pamphlet Pedro Calungsod: Young Visayan "Proto-Martyr" by theologian Catalino Arevalo, SJ, the 17-year-old Ronald Tubid of Oton, Iloilo, then a student-athlete at the University of the East, was chosen to model for a portrait representing Calungsod. This became the basis for Rafael del Casal's painting in 1999, Is which was chosen as the official portrait for Calungsod. The Del Casal image is the first to feature a Christogram, the seal of the Society of Jesus, with which Calungsod was affiliated. The original painting is now enshrined at the Archdiocesan Shrine of Saint Pedro Calungsod in Cebu City.

Several statues representing Calungsod were also commissioned for the beatification, with one brought to Rome and blessed by John Paul II. This became the "Pilgrim Image," now enshrined at the Archdiocesan Shrine of the Black Nazarene of the Society of the Angel of Peace in Cansojong, Talisay, Cebu. Another image was enshrined at the Archdiocesan Shrine of Saint Pedro Calungsod in Cebu City. Both images depict Calungsod wearing a white camisa (shirt) and trousers, with the martyr's palm, a rosary, and a crucifix pressed to his breast. During the novena before his feast day, a replica of the catana used to kill him is set into the arm of the statue.

For the canonization celebrations, the chosen sculpture by Justino Cagayat, Jr., represented Calungsod in mid-stride and carrying the Doctrina Christiana and the martyr's palm pressed to his chest. This image was brought to Rome for the canonization festivities. Upon its return to the Philippines, the image toured the country. When not on a pilgrimage tour, the image is enshrined at the Cebu Archdiocesan Shrine of Saint Pedro Calungsod in the archbishop's residence.

 In film Pedro Calungsod: Batang Martir is a Filipino film with Rocco Nacino in the title role released on December 25, 2013, as an official entry to the 2013 Metro Manila Film Festival. It was written and directed by Francis O. Villacorta and produced by HPI Synergy Group and Wings Entertainment.

Places and things named after Calungsod
Churches
Cebu Archdiocesan Shrine of Saint Pedro Calungsod, Archbishop's Residence Compound, 234 D. Jakosalem St., Cebu City
Chapel of San Pedro Calungsod – SM Aura Premier, Bonifacio Global City, Taguig
Parokya ni San Pedro Calunsod, Diyosesis ng Lucena – Brgy. Pury, San Antonio, Quezon
San Pedro Calungsod Quasi Parish, Poblacion, Muntinlupa
Chapel of San Pedro Calungsod, SM Seaside, South Road Properties, Cebu City
San Pedro Calungsod Parish and Sanctuary of St. Padre Pio, Antipolo
San Pedro Calungsod Parish, Sta. Catalina, Minalin, Pampanga
San Pedro Calungsod Parish- Diocese of Surigao, Sta. Cruz, Placer, Surigao del Norte
San Pedro Calungsod Parish, Cantabaco, Toledo City, Toledo City, Cebu

Films and theater
2013: Pedro Calungsod: Batang Martir2014: "San Pedro Calungsod The Musical Stage Play"

Television
Canonization Of Blessed Pedro Calungsod TV Special Coverage (PTV 4, 2012)
San Pedro Calungsod: Ang Ikalawang Santo Documentary TV Special (ABS-CBN 2, 2013)

Educational institutions
Academia de San Pedro Calungsod – Naga, Cebu
St. Pedro Calungsod Academy (formerly Blessed Pedro Calungsod Academy) – Pasig
San Pedro Calungsod Learning Center – Carmen, Cebu
San Pedro Calungsod Mission School – Maribojoc, Bohol
San Pedro Calungsod Montessori & Science School – San Pedro, Laguna
San Pedro Calungsod Technical Vocational School, Inc. – Zamboanga

See also
List of Filipino Saints, Blesseds, and Servants of God
Roman Catholicism in Guam
Spanish-Chamorro Wars

References

Bibliography
Arevalo, Catalino. Pedro Calungsod, Young Visayan Proto-Martyr, Archdiocese of Manila Youth Ministry 1998, New edition from the Daughters of St. Paul, Manila 2000
Leyson, Ildebrando Jesus. Pedro Calonsor Bisaya, Prospects of a Teenage Filipino, Cebu City, Claretian Publications 1999.
Leyson, Ildebrando Jesus A. Pedro Calonsor Bissaya: Prospects of a Teenage Filipino''. Second Edition. Cebu: Basic Graphics, 2000. 
Putzu, Fr. Salvatorre, "Pedro Calungsod, Young Catechist & Martyr," Second Edition, Manila, Word & Life Publications, Inc., 2012
Bersales, Jose Eleazar Reynes, "San Pedro Calungsod: The Canonization Album," University Of San Carlos Press, Cebu, 2012
Agualada, Jr., Salvador G., "Pedro Calungsod: Patron for the Filipino Youth," Claretian Publications, Inc., Manila, 2012
Orbeta, Ruben, "The Liturgical Cult of San Pedro Calungsod: a Filipino Response to the Universal Call to Holiness," STL University Of America, New York, 2019

External links

Pedro Calungsod Official website
The Archdiocese of Cebu
Website by the Postulatio Causae Beatificationis seu Canonizationis Beati Petri Calungsod

1654 births
1672 deaths
17th-century Christian saints
17th-century executions
17th-century Roman Catholic martyrs
17th-century venerated Christians
Beatifications by Pope John Paul II
Canonizations by Pope Benedict XVI
Roman Catholic child saints
Executed Filipino people
Filipino children
Filipino Roman Catholic saints
Murdered Filipino children
People executed by impalement
People from Cebu
People from Iloilo
People of Spanish colonial Philippines
Spanish East Indies
Visayan people
Cebuano people
Murder in 1672